Rosemont is a station on Metra's North Central Service in Rosemont, Illinois. In Metra's zone-based fare system, Rosemont is in zone D. As of 2018, Rosemont is the 222nd busiest of Metra's 236 non-downtown stations, with an average of 27 weekday boardings. Rosemont was opened on January 30, 2006, along with three other new stations on the North Central Service.

As of December 12, 2022, Rosemont is served by 12 trains (six in each direction) on weekdays.

The station was built into the Balmoral Avenue bridge over the tracks. Parking is available on an embankment at the west end of Berwyn Avenue via Pearl Street.

References

External links 

Balmoral Avenue entrance from Google Maps Street View

Metra stations in Illinois
Rosemont, Illinois
Railway stations in the United States opened in 2006
Railway stations in Cook County, Illinois